The mitral valve, also known as the bicuspid valve or left atrioventricular valve, is one of the four heart valves. It has two cusps or flaps and lies between the left atrium and the left ventricle of the heart. The heart valves are all one-way valves allowing blood flow in just one direction. The mitral valve and the tricuspid valve are known as the atrioventricular valves because they lie between the atria and the ventricles.

In normal conditions, blood flows through an open mitral valve during diastole with contraction of the left atrium, and the mitral valve closes during systole with contraction of the left ventricle. The valve opens and closes because of pressure differences, opening when there is greater pressure in the left atrium than ventricle and closing when there is greater pressure in the left ventricle than atrium.

In abnormal conditions, blood may flow backward through the valve (mitral regurgitation) or the mitral valve may be narrowed (mitral stenosis). Rheumatic heart disease often affects the mitral valve; the valve may also prolapse with age and be affected by infective endocarditis. The mitral valve is named after the mitre of a bishop, which resembles its flaps.

Structure

The mitral valve is typically  in area and sits in the left heart between the left atrium and the left ventricle. It has two leaflets (or "cusps"), an anteromedial leaflet (AMVL) and a posterolateral leaflet (PMVL). The opening of the mitral valve is surrounded by a fibrous ring known as the mitral annulus. The anterior cusp covers approximately two-thirds of the valve (imagine a crescent moon within the circle, where the crescent represents the posterior cusp). Although the anterior leaflet takes up a larger part of the ring and rises higher, the posterior leaflet has a larger surface area.

Leaflets
In Carpentier's classification of a mitral valve, both the posterior and anterior mitral valve leaflets are divided into eight segments: P3 (medial scallop), P2 (middle scallop), P1 (lateral scallop), A3 (anteromedial segment), A2 (anteromedial), A1 (anterolateral), PMC (posteromedial commissure), ALC (anterolateral commissure). Mitral leaflet thickness is usually about 1 mm but sometimes can range from 3–5 mm.

Chordae tendineae

The valve leaflets are prevented from prolapsing into the left atrium by the action of chordae tendineae. The chordae tendineae are inelastic tendons attached at one end to papillary muscles in the left ventricle, and at the other to the valve cusps. Papillary muscles are finger-like projections from the wall of the left ventricle.

When the left ventricle contracts, the pressure in the ventricle forces the valve to close, while the tendons keep the leaflets coapting together and prevent the valve from opening in the wrong direction (thus preventing blood flowing back to the left atrium). Each chord has a different thickness. The thinnest ones are attached to the free leaflet margin, whereas the thickest ones (strut chords) are attached further from the free margin. This disposition has important effects on systolic stress distribution physiology.

Annulus
The mitral annulus is a fibrous ring that is attached to the mitral valve leaflets. Unlike prosthetic valves, it is not continuous. The mitral annulus is saddle shaped and changes in shape throughout the cardiac cycle. The annulus contracts and reduces its surface area during systole to help provide complete closure of the leaflets. Expansion of the annulus can result in leaflets that do not join soundly together, leading to functional mitral regurgitation.

Microscopically, there is no evidence of an annular structure anteriorly, where the mitral valve leaflet is contiguous with the posterior aortic root.

Function

During left ventricular diastole, after the pressure drops in the left ventricle due to relaxation of the ventricular myocardium, the mitral valve opens, and blood travels from the left atrium to the left ventricle.  About 70 to 80% of the blood that travels across the mitral valve occurs during the early filling phase of the left ventricle.  This early filling phase is due to active relaxation of the ventricular myocardium, causing a pressure gradient that allows a rapid flow of blood from the left atrium, across the mitral valve.  This early filling across the mitral valve is seen on doppler echocardiography of the mitral valve as the E wave.

After the E wave, there is a period of slow filling of the ventricle.

Left atrial contraction (left atrial systole) (during left ventricular diastole) causes added blood to flow across the mitral valve immediately before left ventricular systole.  This late flow across the open mitral valve is seen on doppler echocardiography of the mitral valve as the A wave. The late filling of the left ventricle contributes about 20% to the volume in the left ventricle prior to ventricular systole and is known as the atrial kick.

The mitral annulus changes in shape and size during the cardiac cycle. It is smaller at the end of atrial systole due to the contraction of the left atrium around it, like a sphincter. This reduction in annulus size at the end of atrial systole may be important for the proper coapting of the leaflets of the mitral valve when the left ventricle contracts and pumps blood. Leaking valves can be corrected by mitral valve annuloplasty, a common surgical procedure that aims at restoring proper leaflet adjustment.

Clinical significance

Disease
There are some valvular heart diseases that affect the mitral valve. Mitral stenosis is a narrowing of the valve. This can be heard as an opening snap; a heart sound which is not normally present.

Classic mitral valve prolapse is caused by an excess of connective tissue that thickens the spongiosa layer of the cusp and separates collagen bundles in the fibrosa. This weakens the cusps and adjacent tissue, resulting in an increased cuspal area and lengthening of the chordae tendineae. Elongation of the chordae tendineae often causes rupture, commonly to the chordae attached to the posterior cusp. Advanced lesions—also commonly involving the posterior leaflet—lead to leaflet folding, inversion, and displacement toward the left atrium.

A valve prolapse can result in mitral insufficiency, which is the regurgitation or backflow of blood due to the incomplete closure of the valve.

Rheumatic heart disease often affects the mitral valve. The valve may also be affected by infective endocarditis.

Surgery can be performed to replace or repair a damaged valve. A less invasive method is that of mitral valvuloplasty which uses a balloon catheter to open up a stenotic valve.

Rarely there can be a severe form of calcification of the mitral valve annulus that can be mistaken for an intracardiac mass or thrombus.

Mitral Disease can be classified using Carpentier’s classification which is based on the leaflet motion. Type I pertains to normal leaflet motion. Whereas, disease of the valve is categorized to primary mitral regurgitation or secondary mitral regurgitation based on the regurgitant etiology. Type II pertains to excessive leaflet motion leading to leaflet prolapse. Common causes include, but is not limited to, Barlow disease, myxomatous degeneration, inflammation, and papillary muscle rupture. Type III pertains to restrictive motion of the leaflets. Type IIIa pertains to restrictive motion during systole and diastole. Type IIIb pertains to restrictive motion during systole.

Investigation
The closing of the mitral valve and the tricuspid valve constitutes the first heart sound (S1), which can be heard with a stethoscope. It is not the valve closure itself which produces the sound but the sudden cessation of blood flow, when the mitral and tricuspid valves close.. Abnormalities associated with the mitral valve can often be heard when listening with a stethoscope.

The mitral valve is often also investigated using an ultrasound scan, which can reveal the size and flow of blood through the valve.

Etymology
The word mitral comes from Latin, meaning "shaped like a mitre" (bishop's hat). The word bicuspid uses combining forms of bi-, from Latin, meaning "double", and cusp, meaning "point", reflecting the dual-flap shape of the valve.

Gallery

See also
Heart
Heart rhythm
Electrocardiography

References

Further reading

External links
—"Valves of the heart"
Cardiac Valve Animations—Perioperative Interactive Education Group

Cardiac anatomy
Heart valves